Geranium phaeum, commonly called dusky crane's-bill, mourning widow or black widow, is a herbaceous plant species in the family Geraniaceae. It is native to southern, central, and western Europe, and is cultivated as a garden subject. It has dark violet colored flowers. It is unmistakable with dark purple petals turned backwards and with conspicuous projecting stamens and style. Petals crinkly-edged and pointed. Leaves often blotched brown.

The cultivar 'Our Pat' has gained the Royal Horticultural Society's Award of Garden Merit.

References

 A Concise Guide to The Flowers of Britain and Europe, Oleg Polunin, Oxford University Press, paperback reprint 1987, 

phaeum
Plants described in 1753
Taxa named by Carl Linnaeus